El Diario Austral de Los Ríos is a Chilean daily newspaper published in the city of Valdivia. The newspaper was founded in 1982 as El Diario Austral de Valdivia by the newspaper group Sociedad Periodística Araucanía S.A. owned by El Mercurio. It is distributed in Los Ríos Region. Since the Los Ríos Region begun its functions in 2007 the newspaper has also adopted the name of El Diario Austral de la Región de Los Ríos.

External links
 El Diario Austral de Los Ríos

Spanish-language newspapers
Newspapers published in Chile
Publications established in 1982
Mass media in Valdivia
1982 establishments in Chile